John Pory (1572–1636) was an English politician, administrator, traveller and author of the Jacobean and Caroline eras; the skilled linguist may have been the first news correspondent in English-language journalism. As the first Speaker of the Virginia General Assembly, Pory established parliamentary procedures for that legislative body still in use today (although members now elect their Speaker).

Early life and education
Pory was educated at Gonville and Caius College, Cambridge; he earned his bachelor's degree in 1592 and his Masters in 1595.

Politician and traveller

Elected a member of Parliament from the borough of Bridgwater in 1605, Pory served until 1610.

In 1607 Pory travelled through France and the Low Countries, and was involved in a plan to introduce silkworm breeding to England. He spent the years 1611–1616 travelling through Europe, to Italy and as far as Istanbul, where Pory was the secretary of English ambassador Sir Paul Pindar. For a portion of 1617 Pory served as the secretary to the English ambassador to Savoy, Sir Isaac Wake.

In 1619, Pory travelled to the barely decade old English colony in Virginia as secretary to the new governor, Sir George Yeardley. On 30 July, 1619, Gov. Yeardley convened what would be the first session of the Virginia General Assembly in Jamestown, after he and Pory agreed upon an agenda and convened to burgesses from each town. Yeardley also appointed Pory Speaker, and Pory acted as the convocation's secretary, appointing committees to study important questions and report back, as well as establishing rules modelled on those in Parliament. Pory would spend the years 1619–1621 and 1623–1624 in Virginia. He explored Chesapeake Bay by boat in 1620, but in 1624 returned to England and settled in London permanently. He would later publish significant narratives about the Jamestown colony in Virginia, and the Plymouth Colony in Massachusetts.

Early in his career, around 1597, Pory became an associate and protégé of the geographer and author Richard Hakluyt; Hakluyt later termed Pory his "very honest, industrious, and learned friend". Pory was also a friend of Sir Robert Cotton, William Camden, Sir Dudley Carleton, and other members their circles. It was at Hakluyt's urging that Pory engaged in his first literary effort, a translation of a geographic work by Leo Africanus that was published as A Geographical Historie of Africa (1600).

News
In London from the early 1620s on, Pory helped Nathaniel Butter, who was creating news periodicals for the English public. Headquartered at Butter's shop at the sign of the Pied Bull, Pory was a "correspondent" in the literal sense, who maintained exchanges of letters with the wide variety of prominent people he had met and cultivated in his earlier public career. Other similarly-situated men of his generation, like John Chamberlain, played comparable roles in such correspondences and exchanges of news; Pory was atypical and perhaps unique in that he channelled his knowledge and contacts into commercial news ventures, Butter's early newspapers. Pory also ran his own manuscript news service, charging patrons for regular news reports; Viscount Scudamore paid Pory £20 for an annual subscription of weekly bulletins for the year 1632.

In some respects, Pory was the first to do what many modern public figures do, moving among official posts, journalism, and positions in the private sector. He accumulated a wide range of acquaintances with people in a range of positions and locations, and maintained a vigorous letter-writing correspondence with influential people during his later years. However, contemporaries described him as being addicted to both gossip and alcohol.

Influences and connections
Modern scholars who have studied Pory's published works and his correspondence have unearthed a range of linkages with important figures of his era, like John Donne and John Milton. Shakespeare may have borrowed from Pory's book on Africa for his Othello; Ben Jonson used it for The Masque of Blackness. Pory's extant correspondence provides researchers with a wealth of detail about London and Court society in the period. He describes, among other things, the last hours of Sir Walter Raleigh, and brawls between nobles at the Blackfriars Theatre.

Family 
He was the son of William Pory (d.1606?) of Butters Hall, Thompson, Norfolk. John Pory was baptised on 16 March 1572, together with his twin sister Mary.

Who his mother was has for many years been a great mystery.

It is known that John Pory was a first cousin of Temperance Flowerdew, because John Pory writes in a letter to Sir Dudley Carleton on 28 November 1618 of Sir George Yeardley, Temperance's husband, that "this George Yeardley hath married my Cousin German, and infinitely desires my company."

ODNB writes that John Pory was «the son of William Pory (d. 1606?) and his wife, whose maiden name was probably Marsham.»

Temperance's parents were Anthony Flowerdew, of Hethersett, Norfolk, and his wife Martha Stanley, of Scottow, Norfolk.

The maternal grandparents of Temperance Flowerdew were John Stanley of Skottowe in Norfolk (d.1583), and Mary, daughter of John Marsham of Norwich & widow of John Ball of Scottow in Norfolk. According to The Visitation of Norfolk in the year 1563, Volume II, Mary was the 2nd daughter of John Marsham, Sheriff of Norwich in 1510 and Mayor in 1518, by Elizabeth his wife, daughter of Hamond Claxton of Chedeston, Suffolk, gentleman.

John Stanley and Mary Marsham had two children, John Stanley, who died young, and Martha, Temperance's mother. From her first marriage, Mary Marsham had the son Robert Ball of Scottow, who married Mary, the natural daughter of Charles Brandon, Duke of Suffolk.

William Pory married Anne Ball, gentlewoman, on 18 June 1571 at Scottow in Norfolk.

John Pory’s mother was Anne Ball, the sister of Martha Stanley, Temperance’s mother, and the sister of Robert Ball of Scottow (b.1546), who married Mary, the natural daughter of Charles Brandon, Duke of Suffolk. Another sister, Elizabeth Ball, married Edward Downes of Great Melton, and, like her sisters, had a daughter named Mary, like her sister Anne a son named John, of Baber in Norfolk, and a son named Robert, of Furnival's Inn. John Pory's maternal grandparents were John Ball of Scottow in Norfolk, the son of Robert Ball of Ipswich and Margaret, daughter of Robert Brooke, and Mary Marsham, the daughter of John Marsham of Norwich by Elizabeth his wife, daughter of Hamond Claxton of Chedeston, Suffolk, gentleman. The Thomas Marsham (by 1522 – 1557), grocer, who was Member of Parliament (MP) for Norwich in 1553 and Mayor of Norwich 1554–55 was John Pory's great-uncle. Christopher Layer (1531 – 19 June 1600), merchant, burgess of Norwich, and briefly a member of parliament, was another kinsman as the first cousin of his mother.

It is possible John and his twin sister Mary was named for their mother's parents John Ball and Mary Marsham.

John Pory's maternal uncle Robert Ball was a fellow Cambridge alumni, also of Caius College.

Butters Hall or Buttort 
The Pory family sold Butters Hall or Buttort in Thompson, Norfolk, to the Futter family in 1590, after having been a prominent family in the neighbourhood for the whole century.

Notes

References
.

Further reading

.
.
.
.
.

External links
Ockerbloom, John Mark (ed.). "Pory, John, 1572–1636". The Online Books Page. n.d.
Information on John Pory's edition of Leo Africanus's A Geographical Historie of Africa (1600) from Early English Books Online Text Creation Partnership
Letter from John Pory to Sir Dudley Carleton, English ambassador to the Netherlands (1619), published in the Collections of the Massachusetts Historical Society, 4th ser., IX (1871), from American Journeys
Text of letters from John Pory to the Treasurer of the Virginia Company of London (January 1622/1623) and to the Governor of Virginia (autumn 1622), from MayflowerHistory.com
Letter from John Pory to Joseph Mead upon the first removal of the Queen's French attendants (5 July 1626), from H. E. (Henry Ellis) (1824). Original Letters, Illustrative of English History; including Numerous Royal Letters from Autographs in the British Museum, and One or Two Other Collections. London: Harding, Triphook and Lepard, vol. 3, 237–244. 3 vols. Reproduced at Google Books

English civil servants
English non-fiction writers
English male journalists
Alumni of Gonville and Caius College, Cambridge
1572 births
1636 deaths
16th-century English writers
17th-century English writers
16th-century male writers
17th-century English male writers
English MPs 1604–1611
English male poets
Kingdom of England expatriates in the Ottoman Empire